Ronald "Ron" Jones is an American singer-songwriter and musician, who was born in New Orleans, Louisiana. He is the President/CEO of Maximum Entertainment, and has enjoyed a diverse career as a versatile musician, composer, record producer and promoter.

Biography and early life
Raised in a musical family, Ron is the son of Joe Jones who composed and recorded the classic New Orleans hit, "You Talk Too Much." The Jones household was a musical haven frequented with jam sessions including legendary Artists such as Fats Domino, Ray Charles, Professor Longhair, James Booker, Huey Piano Smith, and Jessie Hill. This is where Ron soaked up the surrounding rhythms that nurtured his natural talent. From an early age he began writing songs and playing the piano and drums. He set out for New York after graduating from St. Augustine High School, for college and to work at his dad's recording studio, where he learned music production and the business of music.  He was influenced by Fats Domino, Ray Charles, Professor Longhair, Allen Toussaint, Earl Palmer & Smoky Johnson.

Career/Studio Musician

He later moved to Los Angeles and soon began working with the legendary Little Richard , as a member of his band , and later as his booking agent. As a studio musician he recorded as a drummer, pianist, percussionist, and vocalist on records by Sarah Mclachlan, Daniel Lanois, Brian Eno, The Neville Brothers, Allen Toussaint, Little Richard, Chris Whitley, Peter Gabriel, Marc Cohn, Terrance Simien, Marva Wright, Robbie Robertson, Lisa Germano, and others. Ron's album titled "My Kind of Girl" charted in the United Kingdom, Germany, and Japan. His CD titled "Come to New Orleans" is a tribute to the classic songs of New Orleans in Swing Time.

As a song writer he composed a song that Stevie Wonder recorded for an ad campaign, titled "Kids against Drugs". He collaborated with Ivan Neville and wrote a song recorded by Bonnie Raitt, titled "All Day, All Night." He also collaborated with Daniel Lanois on a song titled "You're Gonna Need Somebody". Ron's production credits include: The legendary Mardi Gras Indian group Bo Dollis & The Wild Magnolias, album titled "1313 Hoodoo Street", Rockin' Dopsie , Jr. & The Zydeco Twisters, "Everybody Scream" , La La Brooks of The Crystal, & others.

His soundtrack credits include performing on: The Last of the Mohicans featuring Daniel Day Lewis, Thelma & Louise starring Geena Davis and Susan Sarandon, and Sling Blade with Billy Bob Thornton. His compositions include the musical score for "Why We Laugh: Black Comedians on Black Comedy", a film co-written by Quincy Newell of Codeblack Entertainment starring Steve Harvey, Eddie Murphy and Chris Rock ; and his composition, "Education," was featured as the theme song for the United Negro College Fund (UNCF) Telethon. His contribution as musical director include MTV's Super Bowl Jams Hosted by Busta Rhymes, and The Ladies of Jazz of New Orleans.

Ron promotes New Orleans Artist throughout the world as well as "The Sounds of New Orleans Review". He has appeared at numerous musical engagements before diverse audiences at concerts, conventions, corporations, colleges/universities, affinity groups, churches, and countless charitable and fundraising events.

Other

When he's not performing, Ron devotes his musical talent and time to the youth and elderly population within the Greater New Orleans area in his efforts to educate, inspire, uplift, and motivate. As a frequent and often requested motivational public speaker, Ron's ongoing desire to blend balance and discipline with ambition and service continues to fuel his passion for the arts.

References

http://www.ronjones-music.com/
http://www.ronald-jones.com/bio.htm
http://maxnola.com/

American male singer-songwriters
Musicians from New Orleans
American male musicians
Singer-songwriters from Louisiana